LexisNexis is a part of the RELX corporation (formerly Reed Elsevier) that sells data analytics products and various databases that are accessed through online portals, including portals for computer-assisted legal research (CALR), newspaper search, and consumer information. During the 1970s, LexisNexis began to make legal and journalistic documents more accessible electronically. , the company had the world's largest electronic database for legal and public-records–related information.

History

LexisNexis is owned by RELX (formerly known as Reed Elsevier).

According to Trudi Bellardo Hahn and Charles P. Bourne, LexisNexis (originally founded as LEXIS) is historically significant because it was the first of the early information services to both envision and actually bring about a future in which large populations of end users would directly interact with computer databases, rather than going through professional intermediaries like librarians. The developers of several other early information services in the 1970s harbored similar ambitions (e.g., OCLC's WorldCat), but met with financial, structural, and technological constraints and were forced to retreat to the professional intermediary model until the early 1990s.

The LexisNexis story begins in western Pennsylvania in 1956, when attorney John Horty began to explore the use of CALR technology in support of his work on comparative hospital law at the University of Pittsburgh Health Law Center. Horty was surprised to discover the extent to which the laws governing hospital administration varied from one state to another across the United States and began building a computer database to help him keep track of it all.

In 1965, Horty's work inspired the Ohio State Bar Association (OSBA) to independently develop its own CALR system, Ohio Bar Automated Research (OBAR). In 1967, the OSBA signed a contract with Data Corporation, a local defense contractor, to build OBAR based on the OSBA's written specifications. Data proceeded to implement OBAR on Data Central, an interactive full-text search system originally developed in 1964 as Recon Central to help U.S. Air Force intelligence analysts search text summaries of the contents of aerial and satellite reconnaissance photographs.  (Before computer vision was invented, text summaries were manually prepared by enlisted personnel called "photo interpreters"; analysts then used those summaries as a catalog to retrieve photographs from which they could draw inferences about enemy strategy.)

In 1968, paper manufacturer Mead Corporation purchased Data Corporation for $6 million to gain control of its inkjet printing technology. Mead hired the Arthur D. Little consulting firm to study the business possibilities for the Data Central technology. Arthur D. Little dispatched a team of consultants from New York to Ohio led by H. Donald Wilson. After Mead asked for a practicing lawyer on the team, Jerome Rubin, a Harvard-trained attorney with 20 years of experience was included. The resulting study concluded that the nonlegal market was nonexistent, the legal market had potential, and OBAR needed to be rebuilt to profitably exploit that market.  At the time, OBAR searches often took up to five hours to complete if more than one user was online, and its original terminals were noisy Teletypes with slow transmission rates of 10 characters per second.  The original OBAR terminals were belatedly replaced with CRT text terminals in 1970.  OBAR also had quality control issues; Rubin later recalled that its data was “unacceptably dirty.”

In February 1970, Mead reorganized Data Corporation's Information Systems Division into a new Mead subsidiary called Mead Data Central (MDC).  Wilson and Rubin, respectively, were installed as president and vice president. A year later, Mead bought out the OSBA's interests in the OBAR project, and OBAR disappears from the historical record after that point.

After Wilson was put in charge, he became reluctant to implement his own study's recommendation to abandon the OBAR/Data Central work to date and start over. In September 1971, Mead's management relegated Wilson to vice chairman of the board (i.e., a nonoperational role) and elevated Rubin to president of MDC.  Rubin pushed the legacy Data Central technology back to Mead Corporation.  Under a newly organized division, Mead Technical Laboratories, Data Central continued to operate as a service bureau for nonlegal applications until 1980.

Rubin then hired a new team to build an entirely new information service dedicated exclusively to legal research.  He coined a new name, LEXIS, from “lex,” the Latin word for law, and “IS” for “information service.”  After several iterations, the original functional and performance specifications were finalized by Rubin and executive vice president Bob Bennett in late summer 1972.  System designer Edward Gottsman supervised the implementation of the specifications as working computer code. At the same time, Rubin and Bennett orchestrated the necessary keyboarding of the legal materials to be provided through LEXIS, and designed a business plan, marketing strategy, and training program. MDC's corporate headquarters were moved to New York City, while the data center stayed in Dayton, Ohio.

Lexis was the first information service to directly serve end users.  Rubin later explained that they were trying “to crack the librarian barrier. Our goal was to get a LEXIS terminal on every lawyer’s desk.”  To persuade American lawyers to use LEXIS (at a time when computer literacy was rare), MDC used aggressive marketing, sales, and training campaigns.

On April 2, 1973, MDC publicly launched LEXIS at a press conference in New York City, with libraries of New York and Ohio case law as well as a separate library of federal tax materials.  By the end of that year, the LEXIS database had reached two billion characters in size and added the entire United States Code, as well as the United States Reports from 1938 through 1973.

By 1974, LEXIS was running on an IBM 370/155 computer in Ohio supported by a set of IBM 3330 disk storage units which could store up to about 4 billion characters.  Its communications processor could handle 62 terminals simultaneously with transmission speed at 120 characters per second per user.  On this platform, LEXIS was able to execute over 90% of searches within fewer than five seconds. Over 100 text terminals had been deployed to various legal offices (i.e., law firms and government agencies) and over 4,000 users had been trained.

By 1975, the LEXIS database had grown to 5 billion characters and could handle up to 200 terminals simultaneously. By 1976, the LEXIS database included case law from six states, plus various federal materials.  MDC turned a profit for the first time in 1977.

In 1980, LEXIS completed its hand-keyed electronic database of all extant U.S. federal and state cases. The NEXIS service, added that same year, provided journalists with a searchable database of news articles.

In September 1981, Rubin and several of his allies (including Bennett and Gottsman) left Mead Data Central to pursue other opportunities.

When Toyota launched the Lexus line of luxury vehicles in 1989, Mead Data Central sued for trademark infringement on the grounds that consumers of upscale products (like lawyers) might confuse "Lexus" with "Lexis". A market research survey asked consumers to identify the spoken word "Lexis". Survey results showed that a nominal number of people thought of the computerized legal search system; a similarly small number thought of Toyota's luxury car division. A judge ruled against Toyota, and the company appealed the decision. Mead lost on appeal in 1989 when the Court of Appeals for the 2nd Circuit held that there was little chance of consumer confusion. Today, the two companies have an amicable business relationship, and in 2002 implemented a joint promotion called "Win a Lexus on Lexis!"

In 1988, Mead acquired the Michie Company, a legal publisher, from Macmillan.

In December 1994, Mead sold the LexisNexis system to Reed Elsevier for $1.5 billion.  The U.S. state of Illinois subsequently audited Mead's income tax returns and charged Mead an additional $4 million in income tax and penalties for the sale of LexisNexis; Mead paid the tax under protest, then sued for a refund in an Illinois state court.  On April 15, 2008, the U.S. Supreme Court agreed with Mead that the Illinois courts had incorrectly applied the Court's precedents on whether Illinois could constitutionally apply its income tax to Mead, an out-of-state, Ohio-based corporation.  The Court reversed and remanded so the lower courts could apply the correct test and determine whether Mead and Lexis were a "unitary" business.

In 1997, LexisNexis acquired 52 legal titles (including the Lawyers' Edition) owned by the Thomson Corporation. Thomson was required to sell the titles as a condition of acquiring competing publisher West.

In 1998, Reed Elsevier acquired Shepard's Citations and made it part of LexisNexis. Before electronic citators like Westlaw's KeyCite appeared, Shepard's was the only legal citation service which attempted to provide comprehensive coverage of American law.

In February 2020, LexisNexis transitioned its database services to the Amazon Web Services cloud architecture, and shut down its legacy mainframes and servers.

In 2020, Estates Gazette and the remaining business of Reed Business Information became part of LexisNexis.

Acquisitions

In 2000, LexisNexis purchased RiskWise, a St. Cloud, Minnesota company. Also in 2000, the company acquired the American legal publisher Matthew Bender from Times Mirror. In 2002, it acquired a Canadian research database company, Quicklaw. In 2002, LexisNexis acquired the Ohio legal publisher Anderson Publishing. In 2004, Reed Elsevier Group, parent company of LexisNexis, purchased Seisint, Inc, from founder Michael Brauser of Boca Raton, Florida. Seisint housed and operated the Multistate Anti-Terrorism Information Exchange (MATRIX).

On March 9, 2005, LexisNexis announced the possible theft of personal information of some Seisint users. It was originally estimated that 32,000 users were affected, but that number greatly increased to over 310,000. Affected persons were provided with free fraud insurance and credit bureau reports for a year. However, no reports of identity theft or fraud were discovered to have stemmed from the security breach.

In February 2008, Reed Elsevier purchased data aggregator ChoicePoint (previous NYSE ticker symbol CPS) in a cash deal for US$3.6 billion.  The company was rebranded as LexisNexis Risk Solutions.

In 2013, LexisNexis, together with Reed Elsevier Properties SA, acquired publishing brands and businesses of Sheshunoff and A.S. Pratt from Thompson Media Group.

Sheshunoff Information Services, A.S. Pratt, & Alex Information (collectively, SIS), founded in 1972, is a print and electronic publishing company that provides information to financial and legal professionals in the banking industry, as well as online training and tools for financial institutions. SIS was founded in 1971 by Alex and Gabrielle Sheshunoff. The company became recognized for providing guidance and analysis to the banking industry. In 1988 Thompson Media, a division of Thompson Reuters, acquired the company. Separately, the Sheshunoffs began publishing Alex Information products.

In 1995, SIS acquired A.S. Pratt & Sons. Established in 1933, Pratt's Letter is believed to be the second oldest continuously published newsletter in the country behind Kiplinger's Washington Letter, which began publication in 1923. A.S. Pratt is a provider of regulatory law and compliance work tools for the financial services industry.

Gabrielle Sheshunoff returned in 2004 to unite the AlexInformation, Sheshunoff, and A.S. Pratt brands before it was sold to Thompson in 2008.

In November 2014, LexisNexis Risk Solutions bought Health Market Science (HMS), a supplier of data about US healthcare professionals.

In May 2022, LexisNexis acquired the behavioural biometrics technology provider, BehavioSec for an undisclosed sum.

Commercial products
LexisNexis services are delivered via two websites that require separate paid subscriptions.

In 2000, Lexis began building a library of briefs and motions. In addition to this, Lexis also has libraries of statutes, case judgments and opinions for jurisdictions such as France, Australia, Canada, Hong Kong, South Africa and the United Kingdom as well as databases of law review and legal journal articles for countries for which materials are available.

Previously, LexisNexis had a stripped-down free version (known as LexisOne) but this has been discontinued
and replaced by Lexis Communities, which provides news and blogs across a variety of legal areas.

Time Matters is a LexisNexis-branded software offering.  Lexis for Microsoft Office is a LexisNexis-branded software offering.

In France, the UK and Australia, LexisNexis publishes books, magazines and journals, both in hard copy and online. Titles include Taxation Magazine, Lawyers Weekly and La Semaine Juridique.

LexisNexis UK
The organization that eventually became LexisNexis UK was founded in 1818 by Henry Butterworth (1786–1860). He was a pupil at King Henry VIII School, Coventry. After leaving Coventry he was apprenticed to and, for some time, worked for his uncle Joseph Butterworth, the great law bookseller of Fleet Street. In 1818, however, disagreement between them as to the terms of partnership made Henry set up on his own account at the corner of Middle Temple Gate (7 Fleet Street), where he became the well-known Queen's Law Bookseller.

Butterworths was acquired by International Publishing Corporation in 1965; IPC was acquired by the Reed Group in 1970. Heinemann Professional Publishing was merged with Butterworths Scientific in 1990 to form Butterworth-Heinemann. The Butterworths publishing business is now owned and operated in the UK by Reed Elsevier (UK) Ltd, a company in the Reed Elsevier Group. Publications continue to be produced by RELX (UK) Ltd using the "LexisNexis", "Butterworths" and "Tolley" trade marks. Such publications include Halsbury's Laws of England and the All England Law Reports, amongst others.

The Butterworths name is also used to publish works in many countries such as Canada, South Africa, Australia and New Zealand.

LexisNexis also produces a range of software, services and products which are designed to support the practice of the legal profession. For example, case management systems, customer relationship management systems ("CRMs") and proofreading tools for Microsoft Office.

Other products
InterAction is a customer relationship management system designed specifically for professional services firms such as accountancy and legal firms.

Business Insight Solutions  offers news and business content and market intelligence tools. It is a global provider of news and business information and market intelligence tools for professionals in risk management, corporate, political, media, and academic markets.

Criticism and controversies

Collaboration with U.S. Immigration and Customs Enforcement (ICE)
In November 2019, legal scholars and human rights activists called on LexisNexis to cease work with U.S. Immigration and Customs Enforcement because their work directly contributes to the deportation of undocumented migrants.

China
In 2017, after being asked to remove some content, LexisNexis withdrew Nexis and LexisNexis Academic from China.

Awards and recognition
 In 2010 and 2011, the Human Rights Campaign recognized LexisNexis as a company that treats its lesbian, gay, bisexual and transgender employees well.
 Training magazine inducted LexisNexis into its "Training Top 125" list between 2007 and 2010. In 2008 the company was 26th on the list, rising 6 places from the previous year, but in 2009 it was 71st place and by 2010 was 105th.
 In 2012, Nexis won the SIIA CODIE Award for Best Political Information Resource.
 In 2013, LexisNexis SmartMeeting won the Stevie Award for sales and customer service.
 In 2014, LexisDraft won the SIIA CODIE Award for Best Business Information Solution.
 LexisNexis made the 2014 Spend Matters Almanac List for 50 Providers to watch for in the procurement sector.

See also 
 AustLII
 CanLII
 CaseMap
 HeinOnline
 LexisNexis Martindale-Hubbell
 Time Matters
 Westlaw
 Wexis

References

Further reading

External links
 

1970 establishments in Ohio
American subsidiaries of foreign companies
Bibliographic database providers
Bibliographic databases and indexes
Companies based in New York City
Customer relationship management software companies
Legal research
Legal software companies
Online law databases
Open-source intelligence
Pre–World Wide Web online services
Publishing companies established in 1970
RELX
1994 mergers and acquisitions